Bahinolophus is an extinct genus of herbivorous mammals that flourished in the middle Eocene and were related to tapirs. The genus was defined in 2005.

References

Eocene odd-toed ungulates
Eocene mammals of Asia
Fossil taxa described in 2005